A sedan service is a transportation service that offers taxi-like rides in vehicles. Sedan services exist in many places, though the exact definition, along with regulations, may vary in different places. In some places, the term refers to a more luxurious service than taxicabs, while in other areas, it is a cheaper alternative. In most places, the ride must be prearranged, and a sedan driver is not legally permitted to pick up a hailing passenger like a taxicab. Also, most sedan services do not use meters like taxicabs, but rather charge by the mile, following the odometer.

Where sedan services are cheaper, many such providers use older vehicles, and do not have the same level of protection as taxicabs, which has raised concerns in some places for both the drivers and passengers.

Some cities that have shortages of taxicabs encourage the use of sedan services to supplement the number of cabs on the streets.

Definitions by places

In the U.S. state of Maryland, the legal definition of a sedan service is the operation of a motor vehicle for hire using a motor vehicle designed to carry 15 or fewer persons, including the driver.

In Canada, the city of Toronto,  Bylaw ( Toronto Municipal Code 546) Provide for SEDAN SERVICE as  Vehicle-for-hire License for Limousine, Taxicab, and Private Transportation Company such as Lyft, Uber, and Private Limo Service Toronto Companies designed to carry 4 or more passenger including the driver.

References

Vehicles for hire